Abia or ABIA may refer to:

ABIA
 Austin-Bergstrom International Airport, in Austin, Texas, United States
 Australian Book Industry Awards, national literary and industry awards

People 
 Abia (name)
 Abia (mythology), the nursemaid of Glenus, the son of Heracles

Places 
 Abia State, state in southeastern Nigeria
 Abia State University
 Abia State Polytechnic
 Abia Warriors F.C., based in the city of Umuahia, Abia State
 Abia de las Torres, a municipality in the province of Palencia, Castile and León, Spain
 Abia de la Obispalía, a municipality in Cuenca, Castile-La Mancha, Spain
 Abia Community, a constituency and community council in the Maseru Municipality in the Maseru District of Lesotho
 Abia (Messenia), town of ancient Messenia, now occupied by Avia, Messenia, Peloponnese, Greece
Abia, Enugu State, town in Enugu State, Nigeria

Other 
 Abia (sawfly), genus of conifer-feeding sawflies
 Abias, a saint of the Coptic Church